The Kisaki nothobranch (Nothobranchius flammicomantis) is a species of killifish in the family Nothobranchiidae. It is endemic to Tanzania.  Its natural habitat is seasonal pools.

References

Links
 Nothobranchius flammicomantis on WildNothos

flammicomantis
Endemic freshwater fish of Tanzania
Kisaki nothobranch
Taxonomy articles created by Polbot